The 2012–13 season was Brighton & Hove Albion's fourth year in the Championship and their second at Falmer Stadium. The club returned to the Championship for the second consecutive season after finishing 10th in the 2011–12 season. The club competed in the 2012–13 League Cup losing in the first round to Swindon Town and they were also defeated in the fifth round of the 2013 FA Cup by Arsenal 3–2.

The club made it to the Championship playoffs for the first time since 1991, however they were eliminated at the semifinal stage following a 2–0 defeat to bitter rivals Crystal Palace at Falmer Stadium. This was followed two days later by the suspension of manager Gus Poyet and his assistants.

Pre-season

Friendlies

Transfers

In

Out
Tommy Elphick, n4 afc Bournemouth, summer

Contracts

Competitions

League table

Results summary

Results round by round

Matches

League Cup

FA Cup

Championship

Squad statistics

Appearances

|-
|colspan="14"|Players currently out on loan:

|-
|colspan="14"|Players who left during the season:

|}

Goalscorers

Disciplinary record

Starting 11
Considering starts in all competitions
As of 28 April 2013

References

Brighton & Hove Albion F.C. seasons
Brighton and Hove Albion